Philip Alexander is an actor best known for playing James Beal in Stargate Origins. He also acted in the TV series S.W.A.T. in Season 1 Episode 5 ("Imposters") as a character named "Norm".

References

External links

Living people
Year of birth missing (living people)
American male television actors
21st-century American male actors